Michal Malák (born 25 August 1980) is a Slovak cross-country skier who has been competing since 1998. Competing in two Winter Olympics, he earned his best finish of 12th in the 4 x 10 km relay at Vancouver in 2010.

His best finish at the FIS Nordic World Ski Championships was 15th in the team sprint at Sapporo in 2007. Malak's best World Cup finish was 11th at a 4 x 10 km event in Sweden in 2004 while his best World Cup individual finish was 41st in an 11.4 km freestyle event at the Czech Republic in 2008.

References
 

1980 births
Cross-country skiers at the 2006 Winter Olympics
Cross-country skiers at the 2010 Winter Olympics
Living people
Olympic cross-country skiers of Slovakia
Slovak male cross-country skiers